Oak Brook is a village mostly in DuPage County with a small portion in Cook County in Illinois. Per the 2020 census, the population was 8,163. This suburb of Chicago has the headquarters of several companies and organizations including Ace Hardware, Blistex, Federal Signal, CenterPoint Properties, Sanford L.P., TreeHouse Foods, and Lions Clubs International. It is the former corporate home of McDonald's and Ferrara Candy (now both moved to Chicago).

History

Oak Brook was originally known as Fullersburg, named after Ben Fuller, an early settler.

Oak Brook was incorporated as a village in 1958, due in large part to the efforts of Paul Butler, a prominent civic leader and landowner whose father had first moved to the vicinity in 1898 and opened a dairy farm shortly thereafter. Prior to incorporation, the name Oak Brook was used by local residents to distinguish their community from neighboring Hinsdale and Elmhurst, going back to the founding of the Oak Brook Civic Association almost two decades earlier.

The original boundaries were smaller than the present extent of the village, but a considerable amount of land was annexed soon after the founding of the village, including the land that is now the site of the Oakbrook Center shopping mall, which opened in 1962.

In 1964 Butler entered a joint venture with the Del E. Webb Corporation of Phoenix, Arizona to increase development of the area. Webb's construction company constructed dozens of buildings in Oak Brook both commercial and residential. The Webb Corporation's involvement in the development of the village lasted into the late 1970s.

Paul Butler's interest in sport was reflected in the Oak Brook Sports Core, which features polo fields, a golf course (which was at one time the venue for the Western Open), swimming and tennis facilities, and other recreational facilities not commonly found in a village of this size.

Geography

Although Oak Brook is not directly served by any CTA or Metra trains, the commercial corridor along 22nd Street is served by several Pace bus routes, and train stations in neighboring villages offer commuter train access to downtown Chicago.

Most of Oak Brook consists of residential subdivisions, with the exception of the Oakbrook Center shopping mall and other retail and office properties along 22nd Street and the Interstate 88 corridor in the northern part of the village.

The village's adjacent neighbors are Elmhurst to the north, Hillside to the northeast, Westchester to the east, Hinsdale and Westmont to the south, Downers Grove to the southwest, and Lombard and Oakbrook Terrace to the northwest.

Demographics
As of the 2020 census there were 8,163 people, 3,029 households, and 2,320 families residing in the village. The racial makeup of the village was 57.79% White, 32.84% Asian, 1.85% African American, 0.09% Native American, 0.02% Pacific Islander, 1.58% from other races, and 5.83% from two or more races. Hispanic or Latino of any race were 4.85% of the population.

There were 3,029 households, out of which 48.00% had children under the age of 18 living with them, 63.19% were married couples living together, 6.54% had a female householder with no husband present, and 23.41% were non-families. 22.85% of all households were made up of individuals, and 19.02% had someone living alone who was 65 years of age or older. The average household size was 3.11 and the average family size was 2.63.

The village's age distribution consisted of 19.4% under the age of 18, 5.9% from 18 to 24, 15.8% from 25 to 44, 23.1% from 45 to 64, and 35.6% who were 65 years of age or older. The median age was 55.1 years. For every 100 females, there were 85.9 males. For every 100 females age 18 and over, there were 87.9 males.

The median income for a household in the village was $140,743, and the median income for a family was $175,500. Males had a median income of $136,125 versus $77,067 for females. The per capita income for the village was $79,838. About 2.0% of families and 4.2% of the population were below the poverty line, including 1.0% of those under age 18 and 5.6% of those age 65 or over.

Note: the US Census treats Hispanic/Latino as an ethnic category. This table excludes Latinos from the racial categories and assigns them to a separate category. Hispanics/Latinos can be of any race.

Education

Public schools
Oak Brook has its own school district, District 53, which includes Brook Forest Elementary School (grades K-5) and Butler Junior High School (grades 6–8). Students that live within the district attend Hinsdale Central High School, District 86. However, some residents of the village are within other DuPage county school districts and attend schools in Elmhurst, Downers Grove or Villa Park.

Middle schools
 Paul Butler Jr. High School (Butler District 53)

High schools
 Hinsdale Township High School District 86 - Hinsdale Central High School
 Elmhurst Community Unit School District 205 - York Community High School
 Community High School District 99 - Downers Grove North High School
 DuPage High School District 88 - Willowbrook High School
 Westmont Community Unit School District 201 - Westmont High School

Colleges
 Community College District 502 - College of DuPage

Private schools
 Sunshine Montessori of Oakbrook

Economy and business

While many Oak Brook residents commute to jobs scattered throughout the Chicago metropolitan area, Oak Brook is also the home of many corporate offices. The world headquarters of McDonald's Corporation was in Oak Brook from 1971, when McDonald's moved into the Oak Brook facility from an office within the Chicago Loop, until 2018, when it moved back to Chicago. Other corporations include Ace Hardware, Blistex, Crowe Horwath, TreeHouse Foods, Federal Signal, Sanford, CenterPoint Properties, Dantech Information Technology, Hub Group and Follett Higher Education Group. Global non-profit organizations such as Lions Clubs International, Zonta International and Institute in Basic Life Principles are also based in Oak Brook.

Top employers
According to the Village's 2020 Comprehensive Annual Financial Report, the top employers in the city are:

Politics

Oak Brook is a predominantly Republican village in presidential elections. Unlike most of DuPage county, it voted for Republican nominees Donald Trump, and Mitt Romney in each of the past three presidential elections.

Notable people

 Chris Chelios, Stanley Cup-winning defenseman with the Detroit Red Wings, who also played for the Montreal Canadiens, Chicago Blackhawks, and Atlanta Thrashers
 William J. Cullerton, World War II flying ace, former host of "Great Outdoors" on WGN Radio 
 Bill Gothard, founder of "The Institute In Basic Life Principles", IBLP
 Stan Mikita, Stanley Cup-winning center with the Chicago Blackhawks
 Dick Portillo, founder of the Portillo Restaurant Group
 Ed Rensi, a former CEO of McDonald's
 Frank Thomas, first baseman with several Major League Baseball teams; lived in Oak Brook (1996–2003)
 Ty Warner, founder of toy company Ty
 Doug Wilson, defenseman with the San Jose Sharks
 Frank Calabrese, Sr., made man and caporegime of the Chicago Outfit

In popular culture
In the medical drama series ER, John Carter's parents are said to live in Oak Brook, referencing it as a rich area. The show filmed a funeral scene in Oak Brook's Bronswood cemetery in its 267th episode, "Twenty-One Guns".

In a popular ad campaign by Hanes, Michael Jordan is asked by an irreverent yet likable "everyman" to join him at a conference in Oak Brook, Illinois, explaining to Jordan that, "...it would mean a lot to the people of Oak Brook."

In the TV series "The X-Files" Oak Brook, IL is the setting for the episode titled "Folie a Deux."

References

External links

Oak Brook Village Profile
Oak Brook Historical Society
Oak Brook Public Library
Butler School District 53
Greater Oak Brook Chamber of Commerce

 
1958 establishments in Illinois
Chicago metropolitan area
Populated places established in 1958
Villages in Illinois
Villages in DuPage County, Illinois